Wiktoria may refer to:

Places
Wiktoria, Masovian Voivodeship, Poland

People with the given name
Wiktoria Johansson (born 1996), or simply Wiktoria, Swedish singer
Wiktoria Goryńska (1902 – 1945), Polish painter and graphic artist
Wiktoria Kiszkis (born 2003), Polish footballer
Wiktoria Pikulik (born 1998), Polish professional racing cyclist
Wiktoria Elżbieta Potocka (died c. 1670), Polish noble lady
Wiktoria Śliwowska (1931–2021), Polish historian
Wiktoria Ulma, rescuer of Polish Jewish families during the Holocaust

See also
Victoria (name)